The 2017 Dakar Rally was the 39th edition of the event and the ninth successive year that the event was held in South America. The event started in Asunción, Paraguay on January 2, then ran through Argentina and Bolivia, before returning to Buenos Aires on January 14 after 12 stages of competition. This year saw the introduction of the new UTV category.

Entries

Bikes

Cars

Quads

Trucks

Stages
Distance according to the official website.

Notes
 Stage 5 shortened due to bad weather (second timed sector cancelled).
 Stage 6 cancelled due to bad weather.
 Bad weather forced to change Stage 7 route.
 M: Marathon Stage (without assistance park at the end of the stage).
 Stage 8 shortened due to bad weather (and second timed sector cancelled for the trucks).
 Stage 9 cancelled due to a landslide.

Stage results

Bikes

Quads

Cars

Trucks

UTV's

Final standings

Bikes

Quads

Cars

Trucks

UTVs

Major retirements

References

Dakar Rally
Dakar Rally
Dakar Rally
Dakar Rally
 Sports competitions in Buenos Aires
Dakar Rally